Mark A. Lemley (born c. 1966) is currently the William H. Neukom Professor of Law at Stanford Law School and the Director of the Stanford Law School Program in Law, Science & Technology, as well as a founding partner of the law firm of Durie Tangri LLP, which he has been practicing with since 2009.

Career

Academic career
Lemley teaches intellectual property, computer and Internet law, patent law, trademark law, antitrust law and remedies at Stanford Law School.  He is the author of seven books, including the two-volume treatise IP and Antitrust and over 150 articles published in law reviews or law journals. He is a widely cited expert on patent law. For example, according to his official biography on the Stanford Law website, his works "have been cited more than 220 times by courts, including eleven United States Supreme Court opinions, and more than 14,000 times in books and law review articles, making him the most-cited scholar in IP law and one of the five most cited legal scholars of all time" and he has also "published 9 of the 100 most-cited law review articles of the last twenty years."

Prior to Stanford Law, where he has been teaching since 2004, he taught law at University of Texas School of Law (1994-2000) as The Marrs McLean Professor of Law and UC Berkeley School of Law (2000-2004) as The Elizabeth Josselyn Boalt Professor of Law.
Among his students include Professor Dmitry Karshtedt.

Private practice
Since 2009, he also practices law as a partner at Durie Tangri LLP, which he co-founded. Before his academic career, Lemley practiced law with the firms of Brown and Bain as well as Fish and Richardson.

Business
Lemley is one of the founders of Lex Machina, a company that provides data analytics involving IP and antitrust litigation to law firms, universities, courts, and policymakers. The company started as a public interest project by Lemley and co-founders  George Gregory and Joshua Walker at Stanford University's Law School and Computer Science department, under the IP Clearinghouse Project.

Education 
Lemley earned his Bachelor of Arts in Political Science and Economics from Stanford University in 1988, where he won the John G. Sobieski Prize in Economics and was a Truman Scholar. He earned his Juris Doctor degree from the University of California Berkeley School of Law (or Boalt Hall School of Law) in 1991, where he graduated first in his class (winning the Thelen Marrin Prize for Academic Achievement given to the top graduate) and was elected into the Order of the Coif. Upon graduation from law school, he served as a judicial law clerk for The Honorable Dorothy Wright Nelson at the United States Court of Appeals for the Ninth Circuit.

Awards 
Lemley has been named California Lawyer's Attorney of the Year twice (in 2005 and 2015) and received the California State Bar's inaugural IP Vanguard Award. In 2007, he was named a Young Global Leader by the Davos World Francisco IP lawyer of the year and Best Lawyers' San Francisco IP Lawyer of the Year in 2010. Lemley was inducted in the 2014 IP Hall of Fame. In 2017, he received the P.J. Federico Award from the Patent and Trademark Office Society. In 2018, Lemley received the World Technology Award for Law. He has been recognized as one of the 25 most influential people in IP by American Lawyer, one of the 100 most influential lawyers in the National Law Journal (in 2006 and 2013), and one of the 10 most admired attorneys in IP by IP360. In 2007, Lemley was recognized as one of the top 50 litigators in the country under 45.

Publications 
Lemley is the author of eight books and 175 articles, including the two-volume treatise IP and Antirust. His articles have appeared in 23 of the top 25 law reviews, in economic journals such as the American Economic Review and the Review of Economics and Statistics. Lemley published 9 of the 100 most-cited law review articles in the last twenty years, more than any other scholar.

References

External links
Mark Lemley's Official Page at Stanford Law School
Mark Lemley's Page at Durie Tangri LLP

1966 births
Living people
Stanford Law School faculty
University of Texas faculty
UC Berkeley School of Law faculty
UC Berkeley School of Law alumni
Stanford University alumni
Patent law scholars
Computer law scholars
Copyright scholars